, known professionally as , is a Japanese rock singer and actor. He was born in Tanashi, Tokyo, Japan. He is the vocalist for the Japanese rock band Red Warriors. He has acted in the Hollywood films Tokyo Pop and Lost in Translation and is often seen on television variety shows.

Movies
He appeared in the following movies:
 Tokyo Pop (1988) in role of Hiro as partner of Carrie Hamilton (Wendy)
 Toy Story (1995) singing the Japanese version of "You've Got a Friend in Me", "Strange Things" and "I Will Go Sailing No More"
 Non-Stop/Dangan Runner (1996)
 Lost in Translation (2003)
 Kamen Rider × Super Sentai: Ultra Super Hero Taisen (2017), Shocker Leader III

Theatre
 Miss Saigon (2016), The Engineer

References

External links 
 Diamond Yukai at Gree 
 Report at Tokyo Newsline 
 

 

1962 births
Living people
Japanese male rock singers
Japanese male actors
Singers from Tokyo
People from Nishitōkyō, Tokyo